Spring Fork may refer to:

Spring Fork, Missouri, an unincorporated community
Spring Fork (Missouri), a stream in Missouri